The 1884 St. Louis Maroons baseball team finished with a 94–19 record and won the championship of the new Union Association (UA). After the season, the UA folded and the Maroons joined the National League; they were the only UA team to continue past the 1884 season.

The Maroons scored 887 runs while allowing 429, for a run differential of +458, the best in major-league history, as records and statistics of the UA are recognized by Major League Baseball (MLB).

The team was back in the news in 2015, when the Golden State Warriors started the 2015–16 season with an NBA-record 24 straight wins; this surpassed the Maroons' 20–0 start, which was previously the record for the four major professional sports leagues in the United States.

Regular season

Season standings

Record vs. opponents

Roster

Player stats

Batting

Starters by position 
Note: Pos = Position; G = Games played; AB = At bats; H = Hits; Avg. = Batting average; HR = Home runs

Other batters 
Note: G = Games played; AB = At bats; H = Hits; Avg. = Batting average; HR = Home runs

Pitching

Starting pitchers 
Note: G = Games pitched; IP = Innings pitched; W = Wins; L = Losses; ERA = Earned run average; SO = Strikeouts

Relief pitchers 
Note: G = Games pitched; IP = Innings pitched; W = Wins; L = Losses; ERA = Earned run average; SO = Strikeouts

Sources
 1884 St. Louis Maroons team page at Baseball Reference

References

St Louis
St. Louis Maroons season
St. Louis Maroons seasons